Tucker Jackson Barnhart (born January 7, 1991) is an American professional baseball catcher for the Chicago Cubs of Major League Baseball (MLB). He has previously played in MLB for the Cincinnati Reds and Detroit Tigers. He made his MLB debut in 2014 and won the Gold Glove Award in 2017 and 2020.

Early life
Barnhart was born in Indianapolis, the son of Kevin and Pam Barnhart, and brother to Paige. When Tucker was 11, the family moved west of Indianapolis to Brownsburg, Indiana. He attended Brownsburg High School and played for the school's baseball team. As a junior in 2008, he hit .500 and was named to the Louisville Slugger High School All-American team. In his senior year at Brownsburg, he was named "Mr. Baseball" for the state of Indiana.

Prior to his senior season, Barnhart committed to attend the Georgia Institute of Technology on a baseball scholarship to play for the Georgia Tech Yellow Jackets.

Professional career

Minor leagues (2009–2013)
Heading into the 2009 Major League Baseball draft, Baseball America rated Barnhart as the best available player from Indiana. Due to his commitment to Georgia Tech, he fell to the 10th round, when he was chosen by the Cincinnati Reds with the 299th overall selection. Barnhart opted to sign with the Reds, rather than enroll at Georgia Tech.

In 2010, Barnhart played for the Billings Mustangs of the Rookie-level Pioneer League. In 2011, he played for the Dayton Dragons of the Class A Midwest League. He spent the 2012 season with the Bakersfield Blaze of the Class A-Advanced California League and Pensacola Blue Wahoos of the Class AA Southern League. He played for Pensacola in 2013, and was named a Southern League All-Star. The Reds added Barnhart to their 40-man roster on November 20, 2013.

Cincinnati Reds (2014–2021)
With Devin Mesoraco beginning the 2014 season on the disabled list, Barnhart made the Reds' 2014 Opening Day roster, as a backup to Brayan Peña. Barnhart made his major league debut on April 3 against the St. Louis Cardinals. Starting at catcher (with Homer Bailey the starting pitcher) and batting eighth, he went 0-for-4 with one strikeout. Two days later, he got his first big-league hit, a single off New York Mets pitcher Dillon Gee; for the game, Barnhart went 2-for-4.

Barnhart was optioned to the Louisville Bats of the Class AAA International League on April 7, when Mesoraco was activated. He was later recalled by the Reds, and on May 1, he hit his first major league home run, a fifth-inning solo shot off the Milwaukee Brewers' Marco Estrada. He was optioned back to Louisville on May 18. On July 6, with Peña on the paternity list and also forced to play more at first base due to injuries, the Reds recalled Barnhart. Barnhart was optioned back to Louisville on July 11.

Due to injuries to Mesoraco, Barnhart started 67 games at catcher for the Reds in 2015 and 108 games in 2016. On September 22, 2017, Barnhart signed a four-year contract extension with the Reds, worth $16 million, plus a $7.5 million club option for the 2022 season. He led National League catchers in wins above replacement and caught stealing percentage. He also led the major leagues in runners caught stealing (32). After the 2017 season, he won his first Gold Glove Award.

In June 2019, he suffered a moderate abdominal and oblique strain, and was placed on the injured list. In late August 2019, he gave up switch hitting and became a left-handed hitter.

In 2020 for the Reds, Barnhart played in 38 games, batting .204/.291/.388 with five home runs and 13 RBIs. After the season, he was rewarded the Gold Glove Award for NL catchers, the second Gold Glove Award of his career. On May 7, 2021, Barnhart caught Wade Miley's no-hitter. He finished the 2021 season batting .247/.317/.368 with 7 home runs and 48 RBIs in 116 games.

Detroit Tigers (2022)

On November 3, 2021, the Reds traded Barnhart to the Detroit Tigers for Nick Quintana. On November 7, the Tigers exercised the $7.5 million option for Barnhart for the 2022 season. Barnhart batted .221 with a .554 on-base plus slugging in 94 games for the Tigers in 2022.

Chicago Cubs
Barnhart signed a two-year contract for $6.5 million with the Chicago Cubs on December 29, 2022.

Personal life
Barnhart and his wife, Sierra, married in November 2015. They welcomed their first child, a son, in September 2017. Their second son was born in 2020.

He grew up just west of Indianapolis in the city of Brownsburg and now resides just south of Indianapolis. He is a childhood friend of Gordon Hayward and Drew Storen.

References

External links

1991 births
Living people
Baseball players from Indianapolis
Major League Baseball catchers
Cincinnati Reds players
Detroit Tigers players
Gulf Coast Reds players
Billings Mustangs players
Dayton Dragons players
Bakersfield Blaze players
Pensacola Blue Wahoos players
Glendale Desert Dogs players
Louisville Bats players
Gold Glove Award winners